Rabča is a large village and municipality in Námestovo District in the Žilina Region of northern Slovakia.

History
In historical records the village was first mentioned in 1564 as Rabcza.

Geography
The municipality lies at an altitude of 620–670 metres and covers an area of 25.157 km². It has a population of about 5,000 people.

References

Villages and municipalities in Námestovo District